William Woodrow Hart (March 4, 1913 – July 29, 1968) was an American third baseman and shortstop in major league baseball who played from 1943 to 1945 for the Brooklyn Dodgers. Born in Wiconisco, Pennsylvania, he died at age 55 in Lykens, Pennsylvania.

References

External links

1913 births
1968 deaths
Major League Baseball third basemen
Brooklyn Dodgers players
Baseball players from Pennsylvania
Harrisburg Senators players
Duluth Dukes players
Portsmouth Red Birds players
Asheville Tourists managers
Asheville Tourists players
New Orleans Pelicans (baseball) players
St. Paul Saints (AA) players
Oakland Oaks (baseball) players
Mobile Bears players
Cairo Dodgers players
Santa Barbara Dodgers players